The 2004 European Open was the 2004 edition of the European Open snooker tournament, held from 1 to 6 March 2004, at the Hilton Conference Centre, Portomaso, Malta. It was the final year the event was known as European Open, as the event was renamed to Malta Cup in next year. Stephen Maguire defeated Jimmy White by nine  to three (9–3) in the final to claim his first ranking-event title, transforming him from "talented underachiever into a world-ranking event winner", according to The Times. In the semi-finals Maguire defeated Stephen Lee and White beat Tony Drago. The tournament was the fifth of eight WPBSA ranking events in the 2003/2004 season, following the Welsh Open and preceding the Irish Masters.

Tournament summary 
Prior to the 1988/1989 season no ranking tournament had been continuously staged outside of the United Kingdom (although the World Championship had been held twice in Australia). The snooker governing body, the World Professional Billiards and Snooker Association (WPBSA), decided to include overseas events and the first two locations chosen were Canada and Europe. The European Open was first held in 1989 in Deauville, France, and was suspended for 1997/1998 and 2000/2001. It moved to the Hilton Conference Centre, Portomaso, Malta for the first time in 2004 and was renamed the Malta Cup the following season.

The 2004 tournament was the fifth of eight WPBSA ranking events in the 2003/2004 season, following the Welsh Open and preceding the Irish Masters. Held in January, the Welsh Open was won by Ronnie O'Sullivan, who defeated Steve Davis by nine  to eight (9–8) in the final. The defending European Open champion was also O'Sullivan, who defeated Stephen Hendry 9–6 in last year's final. Paul Hunter, who had defeated O'Sullivan in the final of the non-ranking Masters in February, entered the tournament "playing the best snooker of his career", according to Phil Yates of The Times.

Qualifying 
The qualifying stage was played between players ranked 17 and those ranked lower for one of 16 places in the final stage. The matches were best-of-9 frames until the semi-finals. In March 2004 Maltese player Tony Drago defeated Adrian Gunnell 5–2 in a match held over from the qualifying stage in November.

Round 1 
The qualifiers went through to face members of the top 16. In this round, Davis came from 2–4 down to beat Joe Swail 5–4, in a match where both players missed chances. In the deciding frame, Davis won on the pink ball after Swail had missed the brown. After the match, Davis said it was a historic day as he had never won a match in the country. Stephen Lee received a walkover to the next round after his opponent Robin Hull withdrew due to medical reasons. Chris Small, who suffers from the spinal condition ankylosing spondylitis, whitewashed UK champion Matthew Stevens 5–0, in a match lasting almost three hours and which saw Stevens lose two frames on the black ball. Neil Robertson defeated Ken Doherty 5–3, and Joe Perry beat David Roe by the same scoreline. In the last match of the day, David Gray beat Fergal O'Brien 5–3.

World number one Mark Williams was defeated 1–5 by Anthony Hamilton, who made a break of 133. Williams refused to answer questions at the post-match press conference, explaining: "I'm not saying anything because if I do I could be in trouble so I'm keeping my mouth shut." Hunter and Hendry made high breaks of 49 and 55 in defeating Brian Morgan and Jimmy Michie 5–1, respectively. After the match Hendry—the world number two and a seven-time world champion said "I feel like going to apologise to each fan one by one because it was such a bad match". John Higgins whitewashed Barry Pinches 5–0, compiling a 132 break in the last frame in a match where Pinches made a high break of 33. Jimmy White overcame James Wattana 5–4 having trailed 2–3. Graeme Dott defeated Drew Henry 5-3 and Quinten Hann beat Simon Bedford 5–0. In the last game of the day, Drago beat Alan McManus 5–4.

Round 2 
In round two O'Sullivan defeated Small 5–1, coming from behind to win in each of the first three frames with breaks of 58, 81, and 46. A break of 112 completed the victory, after which O'Sullivan said his opponent had made him work. In the fifth frame O'Sullivan continued playing despite needing snookers, later explaining, "I wanted to keep playing because I was enjoying it so much". White made breaks of 72, 52, 69, 51, and 65 in defeating Hendry 5–3, after which Hendry said his performance was "horrendous", and White said his refusal to go out the night before contributed to his performance. In the sixth frame White led by 41 points before missing an easy red, allowing Hendry to win on the black with a 55 break to level at 3–3. White dominated the next two frames for the victory. Higgins, without a tournament victory for over two years, whitewashed Dott 5–0 with breaks of 82, 81, 57, and 52, and said it was the "best [he had] felt for ages". Drago defeated Hunter 5–2 to reach the quarter-finals of a ranking events for the first time since 1998, in a low-quality match where Drago made one break over 50. Lee defeated Davis 5–3 in a four-hour match, and Higgins completed a second whitewash when he beat Dott 5–0, bringing his career record against Dott to 9–1. Maguire defeated Perry 5–4 to reach his first ranking quarter-final, and Hann beat Hamilton 5–1 to claim the final place in the next round.

Quarter-finals 
In the quarter-finals Lee defeated O'Sullivan 5–4 in a match that lasted 3 hours and 32 minutes. O'Sullivan came from 2–3 down to lead 4–3 before Lee leveled the match. In the final frame O'Sullivan led 36–0, before Lee made a 46 break and fluked a snooker that enabled him to claim victory. O'Sullivan said his performance was very poor, while Lee said he was quietly confident. White defeated Robertson 5–3 to reach his third semi-final of the season. White led 4–1 and was 56 points ahead in the sixth but missed a straightforward green, allowing Robertson to win on the black with a 67 break. Robertson took the next frame before a risky long pot in the eighth allowed White to win the match. White—who last won a ranking title 12 years ago prior at this event—said, "Everyone knows I've been in front so many times in the past and tossed it away so I was having nightmares out there". Drago quickly won the first four frames of his match against Hann, conceding the fifth, before completing a 5–1 victory, after which he said the crowd support helped him. Maguire caused an upset when he beat Higgins 5–3, a match that saw Maguire lose the first two frames before winning the next four. After the match Maguire he said he had "starting to think about winning it now".

Semi-finals 
The semi-finals were best-of-11 frames. White reached his first final in four years when he defeated Drago 6–4. Leading 4–1 White made a break of 104 to win the sixth frame, before missing a straightforward red to allow his opponent to win the seventh with an 84 break. Drago won the next two in 15 minutes with breaks of 44 and 109—completing the latter in four minutes—before an 86 break gave White the victory, after which White said, "Playing Tony here, I got a taste of what players have against me at the Masters when the crowd are all on my side but they were fair and I enjoyed every minute of it."

In the other semi-final Maguire beat Lee 6–4 in an error-strewn match which lasted four hours. After winning the first two frames Maguire lost the next three, but "kept his cool" to seal the victory. Maguire said the match was a "battle" and that he was surprised at how badly his opponents had played in the tournament, while Lee said he "just blew up" and that, "When you’re as poor as that you get into such a state of mind that you can’t think straight".

Final 
The match was White's 23rd appearance in a final and his first since the 2000 British Open. In the best-of-17 final Maguire defeated White 9–3 to win his first ranking title at the age of 22, earning £48,000 in prize money. The victory, according to The Times, transformed Maguire from "talented underachiever into a world-ranking event winner";
 according to BBC Sport his victory was a surprise.

In the afternoon session Maguire made two sizeable breaks and one of 137 to lead 3–0. He won the next frame and compiled a century in the fifth. The sixth frame was awarded to Maguire, when White violated the three-miss rule.  in the jaws of a corner pocket, White twice attempted to hit the pack of five reds off a side cushion and missed. On his third attempt he adopted a slow roll to the pack and again missed. In the evening session, trailing 0–6, White won his first frame before the next four were shared, the last of which included a break of 125 by White. At 8–2 a break of 57 gave Maguire the victory.

After his victory Maguire acknowledged the influence of Terry Griffiths who had been working with him on the mental side of the game: "He's been on the phone just telling me to keep calm and that I can do it if I believe in myself". Maguire said he always knew he was good enough to win a tournament and that he would aim for a top-16 finish for the season. White said, "Stephen outplayed me in safety, potting and position so he deserved to win" and, "He gave me a good bashing. I'm pleased for him because he's a nice lad but I'm disappointed because I didn't compete".

Prize fund
The breakdown of prize money for this year is shown below:

Winner: £48,000
Final: £24,000
Semi-final: £12,000
Quarter-final: £7,900
Last 16: £6,900
Last 32: £5,500
Last 48: £2,900
Last 64: £2,100

Last 80: £1,600
Last 96: £1,050
Stage one highest break: £1,800
Stage two highest break: £5,000
Stage one maximum break: £5,000
Stage two maximum break: £20,000
Total: £400,000

Main draw 
Numbers to the left of the players' names are the tournament seedings. Players in bold denote match winners.

Key

w/o = walkover
w/d = withdrew

Final 
Scores in bold denote winning frame scores and the winning participant.

Qualifying
Qualifying for the tournament took place at Pontin's in Prestatyn, Wales between 31 October and 5 November 2003.

Round 1 
Best of 9 frames

Round 2–5

Century breaks

Qualifying stage centuries

 144  Michael Judge
 140  Lee Walker
 139, 102  Barry Pinches
 135  Martin Dziewialtowski
 135  Ali Carter
 131  Mike Dunn
 129  Leo Fernandez
 128  Kwan Poomjang
 128  Ian Brumby
 124, 100  Anthony Hamilton
 121  Rory McLeod
 121  Joe Swail
 120  Brian Morgan
 120  David Roe
 119  Philip Williams

 117  Kurt Maflin
 116  Stuart Bingham
 115  Chris Small
 114  Adrian Gunnell
 111  Dave Harold
 108, 101  Robin Hull
 107  Liu Song
 106  Tom Ford
 106  Stephen Maguire
 106  John Parrott
 106  Patrick Wallace
 105  Jamie Cope
 104  Jimmy Michie
 102  Ding Junhui

Televised stage centuries

 137, 103  Stephen Maguire
 133  Anthony Hamilton
 132  John Higgins
 125, 104, 103  Jimmy White

 112, 110  Ronnie O'Sullivan
 109, 100  Neil Robertson
 109  Tony Drago
 100  Peter Ebdon

Notes

References

Sources 
 European Open 2004. snooker.org.
 Embassy World Rankings 2003/2004. snooker.org.

2004
European Open
European Open (snooker)
European Open
Snooker in Malta